Tsubaki Grand Shrine of America, also sometimes known as Tsubaki America Jinja or in Japanese as , is the first Shinto shrine built in the mainland United States after World War II. It was erected in 1986 in Stockton, California, and moved to its current location next to the Pilchuck River in Granite Falls, Washington, in 2001.

Gosaijin (enshrined Kami/Spirits) of Tsubaki Grand Shrine of America are Sarutahiko-no-Ōkami, ancestor of all earthly Kami and Kami of progressing positively in harmony with Divine Nature; and his wife Ame-no-Uzume-no-Mikoto, Kami of arts and entertainment, harmony, meditation and joy.  Also enshrined are Amaterasu Ōmikami (Kami of the Sun), Ugamitama-no-Ōkami (Kami of foodstuffs and things to sustain human life/Oinarisama), America Kokudo Kunitama-no-Kami (protector of the North America Continent) and Ama-no-Murakumo-Kuki-Samuhara-Ryu-O (Kami of Aikido).

Tsubaki Grand Shrine of America is a branch of Tsubaki Ōkami Yashiro, one of the oldest and most notable shrines in Japan. The current Guji (Head Priest) is Rev. Koichi Barrish, the first non-Japanese priest in Shinto history.

See also
 Misogi
 List of Shinto shrines in the United States

References

External links
Tsubaki Grand Shrine of America
Tsubaki Ōkami Yashiro in Mie Prefecture, Japan

Japanese-American culture in Washington (state)
Shinto shrines in the United States
Religious buildings and structures in Washington (state)
Buildings and structures in Snohomish County, Washington
Tourist attractions in Snohomish County, Washington
Religious buildings and structures completed in 1986
Religious buildings and structures completed in 2001
20th-century Shinto shrines